Parliamentary elections were held in Portugal on 5 April 1908. The Regeneration Party emerged as the largest party in Parliament, winning 62 seats.

Results

The results exclude seats from overseas territories.

References

Legislative elections in Portugal
Portugal
1908 elections in Portugal
April 1908 events